Tectitethya is a genus of sea sponges belonging to the family Tethyidae. There are five described species in this genus with the first member having been described in 1900.

Species
Species in this genus include:
 Tectitethya crypta (de Laubenfels, 1949)
 Tectitethya keyensis Sarà & Bavestrello, 1996
 Tectitethya macrostella Sarà & Bavestrello, 1996
 Tectitethya raphyroides Sarà & Bavestrello, 1996
 Tectitethya topsenti (Thiele, 1900)

References 

Hadromerida